Chaeronea (English:  or ;) is a village and a former municipality in Boeotia, Greece, located about 35 kilometers east of Delphi. Since the 2011 local government reform it is part of the municipality Livadeia, of which it is a municipal unit. The municipal unit has an area of 111.445 km2, the community is 26.995 km2. Population 1,382 (2011). It is located near Mount Thourion in the Kifisós river valley, NW of Thebes.

History
First settled in the Prehistoric period at the site now known as Magoula Balomenou (Μαγούλα Μπαλωμένου), its older name was Arne, and it was originally on the shore of Lake Copais (later drained). Chaeronea was subject to Orchomenus which was, beginning in 600 BC, a member of the Boeotian League. In the late 5th century BC, Chaironeia belonged to one of the 11 Boeotian districts along with Acraephnium and Copia.

Chaeronea's importance lay in its strategic position near the head of the defile which presents the last serious obstacle to an invader in central Greece, and it was the site of several historical battles. The best known is that of 338 BC, between Philip II of Macedon and a coalition of various Greek states, mainly Thebes and Athens. According to Plutarch (but disputed by modern historians), during the battle the elite unit of Theban soldiers known as the Sacred Band of Thebes was wiped out completely (See Battle of Chaeronea). The fragmentary monument was reassembled and installed in 1902 by an organisation called the Order of Chaeronea atop a pedestal at the site of its discovery.

The ancient biographer and essayist Plutarch was born in Chaeronea, and several times refers to these and other facts about his native place in his writings.

Other battles around Chaeronea:
Plutarch refers to many graves of Amazons near the by the stream of Haemon, and assumes that these were casualties during the Amazon journey back home after the conclusion of the Attic war.
After capturing Chaeronea in 447 BC the Athenians were attacked and defeated in the same year by the Boeotians at the Battle of Coronea.
In 146 BC the Roman general Matellus defeated a unit of 1,000 Arkadians.
In 86 BC, Archelaus and Taxiles, generals of Mithridates VI of Pontus, landed in Boeotia. They were met by the Roman general Lucius Cornelius Sulla near Chaeronea and in the ensuing battle the Mithridatics, despite their greatly superior numbers, were defeated and retreated to Chalcis.
Battle between Catalans and Franks on March 15, 1311. The Catalan Company defeated the Franks and took control of great part of Greece. Turks participated with the side of Catalans. The battle is described by Ramon Muntaner, a Catalan soldier.
Battle between Greeks and Turks in 1823 and 1825 during the Greek Revolution (1821–1828).

The site of the Theban mass grave was excavated in 1879–80 by Panagiotis Stamatakis, and the prehistoric site of Magoula Balamenou 23 years later by the archaeologist George Soteriadis.

Transport
The settlement is served by Chaeronea railway station, with local stopping services to Athens and Leianokladi.

References

Populated places in Boeotia
Populated places in ancient Boeotia
Boeotian city-states